Gerald Thomas Schoen (January 20, 1947 – May 5, 2021) was an American professional baseball pitcher who appeared in one game in Major League Baseball as a member of the Washington Senators in .

Schoen entered baseball when Washington drafted him out of Loyola University New Orleans with its 22nd selection in the 1966 Major League Baseball draft. His lone MLB appearance came at the end of his third season in the minor leagues when rosters expanded from 25 to 40 men. Schoen was the starting pitcher against the New York Yankees on September 14 at District of Columbia Stadium. After facing the minimum of six hitters in his first two innings, Schoen surrendered a run in the third, and then a two-run home run by Roy White in the fourth. He was relieved by fellow rookie Jim Miles with two out and the Senators trailing, 3–0. New York won the contest, 4–1, with Schoen absorbing the loss in his only big-league game.

In 3 innings pitched, he allowed three earned runs on six hits and one base on balls, and had one strikeout—the first batter he faced, Horace Clarke. Schoen went 0-for-1 in his only MLB at-bat against the Yankees' starter and winner, Al Downing.

He pitched three more seasons in the minors before retiring from baseball after the 1971 campaign.

References

External links

1947 births
2021 deaths
Baseball players from New Orleans
Buffalo Bisons (minor league) players
Burlington Senators players
Charlotte Hornets (baseball) players
Dallas–Fort Worth Spurs players
Geneva Senators players
Loyola Wolf Pack baseball players
Major League Baseball pitchers
People from Lynchburg, Tennessee
Rochester Red Wings players
Savannah Senators players
Syracuse Chiefs players
Vancouver Mounties players
Washington Senators (1961–1971) players